Karl Douglas (born June 17, 1949) is a former American football quarterback who played three seasons in the Canadian Football League (CFL) with the BC Lions and Calgary Stampeders. He was drafted by the Baltimore Colts in the third round of the 1971 NFL Draft. Douglas was cut by the Colts in 1972 and picked up by the Bills. He played college football at now Texas A&M University–Kingsville and attended Worthing High School in Houston, Texas. He was also a member of the San Antonio Gunslingers of the United States Football League (USFL).

References

External links
Just Sports Stats
Totalfootballstats.com
Texas A&I NFL Draft Results
Sports Illustrated articles
CFLapedia Database

1949 births
Living people
Players of American football from Houston
Players of Canadian football from Houston
African-American players of American football
American football quarterbacks
Texas A&M–Kingsville Javelinas football players
Baltimore Colts players
Buffalo Bills players
San Antonio Gunslingers players
African-American players of Canadian football
Canadian football quarterbacks
BC Lions players
Calgary Stampeders players
21st-century African-American people
20th-century African-American sportspeople